Carl Frampton  (born 21 February 1987) is a former professional boxer from Northern Ireland who competed from 2009 to 2021. He held world championships in two weight classes, including the WBA (Unified) and IBF super-bantamweight titles between 2014 and 2016, and the WBA (Super) featherweight title from 2016 to 2017. He also held the WBO interim featherweight title in 2018. At regional level, he held the European and Commonwealth super-bantamweight titles between 2011 and 2014.

By winning the featherweight world title in 2016, Frampton became the first boxer from Northern Ireland to have held world titles in two weight classes. This earned him Fighter of the Year awards from The Ring magazine, the Boxing Writers Association of America and ESPN.

In December 2019, Frampton was ranked as the world's fourth-best active super-featherweight by BoxRec and fifth-best active featherweight by The Ring. He retired after losing in his WBO junior-lightweight title fight against Jamel Herring.

Amateur career
Amateur boxing in both the Republic of Ireland and Northern Ireland is governed by the Irish Amateur Boxing Association. As an amateur, Frampton fought out of the Midland Boxing Club in Tiger's Bay and won the Irish senior flyweight title in 2005 and added the Irish featherweight title in 2009, beating David Oliver Joyce in the final.

He also claimed a silver medal at the 2007 European Union Amateur Boxing Championships in Dublin, losing to France's Khedafi Djelkhir in the final.
Frampton is one of Ireland's most successful amateur boxers of recent years, winning 114 of his fights and losing only 11 times.

Later commenting on his decision to box for the Irish team, Frampton, who grew up in a Unionist area of Belfast, said "I get asked all the time, 'would you have liked to have boxed for Great Britain?' And the answer is 'no'. I was looked after by Irish boxing from pretty much 11 years old and was very proud to box for Ireland." He added, "it's very humbling to know that so many people are supporting me from all over Ireland and mainland UK."

Professional career

Super-bantamweight

Early career
Frampton turned professional after his victory in the 2009 Irish featherweight finals. In June 2009, fought his first professional fight at the Olympia, Liverpool, in England and beat Sandor Szinavel with a second-round knock-out on a card that included Grzegorz Proksa and Ajose Olusegan. In January 2010, he was named Ireland's Prospect of the Year at the Irish National Boxing Awards. In September 2010 he recorded an "electrifying" win over the Ukrainian Yuri Voronin in front of an Ulster Hall crowd which included Daniel Day-Lewis. The win led the Belfast Telegraph to liken him to a "reincarnation" of Barry McGuigan.

In December 2010, Frampton won his first professional title, the BBBofC Celtic super-bantamweight title, with a second-round TKO win over Scottish boxer Gavin Reid in the Ulster Hall. Following his victory, Frampton described the super-bantamweight division as being "super-hot" and named Scott Quigg and Rendall Munroe as potential opponents. He then went on to get a fourth-round TKO win over Venezuelan Oscar Chacin, and later fought his first defence of his BBBofC Celtic title against Welshman Robbie Turley in June 2011, winning by a unanimous decision after ten rounds.

Domestic and regional success
Carl fought Australian Mark Quon as a replacement for Kiko Martinez on 10 September for the Commonwealth super-bantamweight title at the Odyssey Arena in Belfast winning by a fourth-round TKO stoppage. On 28 January 2012, he successfully defended his Commonwealth title against Kris Hughes in the York Hall, with the fight having to be stopped in the seventh round. According to the BBC, Frampton controlled the contest from the start and was never threatened by his opponent. On 17 March 2012, Frampton once again defended his title against Ghana's Prosper Ankrah and won by a second-round TKO stoppage. After his victory Frampton challenged the British champion Scott Quigg saying that "I don't know if he wants it but, if he does, he should tell his promoter".

Frampton then beat fellow unbeaten contender Raúl Hirales, Jr. (previously 16–0, 8 KO's) of Mexico by a unanimous decision and won the vacant IBF Inter-continental super-bantamweight title on the undercard of Carl Froch vs. Lucian Bute in Nottingham, UK. The fight took place on 26 May 2012. On 22 September 2012, Frampton took on former two-time world champion Steve Molitor. The fight took place in the Odyssey Arena in Belfast on a card that included Martin Lindsay and Paul McCloskey. Frampton scored an impressive sixth-round TKO and had the former champion on the canvas three times during the bout. After the fight, Frampton announced that he was willing to "fight anyone" and that he was "ready for a world title fight".

On 9 February 2013, Carl Frampton faced hard-punching Spaniard Kiko Martinez in front of 8,000 of his home fans in the Odyssey Arena in Belfast. Martínez, the European champion, had previously knocked out Bernard Dunne in 86 seconds to win the title and had never been knocked down. Frampton won by TKO in Round 9, winning the European super-bantamweight title and retaining the IBF Inter-Continental super-bantamweight title. After the fight Frampton said "I just want the people of Belfast to be proud of me", and described his beaten opponent as "hard as nails". In August 2014, Martinez won the IBF title with a sixth-round stoppage of the previously unbeaten Colombian Jonatan Romero.

On 19 October 2013, Frampton defended his EBU and IBF Inter-Continental titles in an IBF title eliminator against IBF fourth-ranked Jeremy Parodi. The fight took place in front of a maximum capacity 9,000 fans at the Odyssey Arena, Belfast. Frampton knocked Parodi out with a body shot at the end of the sixth round. On 4 April 2014 Frampton faced the Mexican Hugo Cazares at the Odyssey Arena in a final eliminator for Leo Santa Cruz's WBC super-bantamweight title. In front of a sold-out crowd of 9,000 Frampton knocked out Cazares in the second round, with a left hook to the head.

Frampton vs. Martínez II
Frampton challenged for his first world title on 6 September 2014 in a rematch against Kiko Martinez (31-4, 23 KOs). Martinez's IBF super-bantamweight title was at stake and the bout took place in an outdoor arena at the Titanic Quarter in Belfast. In the build-up to the fight, Frampton said of Martinez: "He's very emotional and that's what makes him dangerous... he's a hot-head, he can be very easily agitated but he's coming to win". Fighting in front of a crowd of 16,000 Frampton knocked Martinez down in the fifth round and won by unanimous decision, with two scores of 119-108 and one score of 118–111, winning his first world title. Interviewed after the fight Frampton said "I've got the world title. I feel a bit emotional – it has been a long time coming, it has been a hard road. I intend to hang on to it for a very long time." He went on to call for a unification fight with the WBA champion Scott Quigg, saying "I'll fight him in Manchester, I'll fight him anywhere". After the fight, Barry McGuigan said of his protégé  "This kid could end up as the best Irish fighter there has ever been."

As result of his performances Frampton was nominated for the 2014 RTE Sports Person of the Year. In 2015, he was named Britain's Coolest Man by ZOO Magazine beating the likes of David Beckham, Tom Hardy and Ed Sheeran to get the award. Frampton said after receiving the award, 
"I couldn't believe it when they told me, I thought it was a wind-up! But it's great, especially as it's ZOO readers and the people of Britain who have voted for me. It's also great for the sport of boxing."

Frampton was appointed Member of the Order of the British Empire (MBE) in the 2016 New Year Honours for services to boxing.

Frampton vs. Avalos
In December 2014, it was announced that Frampton would make his first defence of his title on 28 February 2015 against American Chris Avalos (25-2, 19 KOs) at the Odyssey Arena in Belfast, Northern Ireland. ITV decided to pick up the bout in the UK. For the fight, Frampton sparred with then-unbeaten Horacio "Violent" García, who later fought each other in 2017. A sell-out crowd of 11,000 filled the arena. Frampton defended his world title against Avalos in a one-sided, fifth-round knockout, where referee Foster waved off the contest at 1 minute, 33 seconds. The fight averaged 1.1 million viewers and peaked at 1.9 million viewers on ITV.

Frampton vs. González Jr.
It was announced that Frampton would make a second defence of his IBF World title on 18 July at the Don Haskins Convention Center, El Paso, Texas against 22-year-old Alejandro González Jr. live on ITV. Gonzalez, who was a massive underdog, scored two knockdowns in the first round and appeared to ruin Frampton's plans. Frampton shook off the knockdowns, came back strong and rolled to a decisive unanimous decision in a highly entertaining fight that headlined the Premier Boxing Champions card on CBS. Despite the anxious early moments, Frampton won 116–108, 116-108 and 115–109 on the scorecards. Referee Mark Calo-Oy warned González for hitting Frampton with a low blow in the second round and then took away a point when he did it again in the third round. Frampton controlled the fight from there on. According to CompuBox punch statistics, Frampton connected on 246 of 692 blows (36 percent), whilst Gonzalez landed 145 of 593 (24 percent). The fight averaged 1.7 million viewers and peaked at 2.4 million at 10:55pm on ITV.

Frampton vs. Quigg
On 27 February 2016, Frampton fought his long-awaited opponent, undefeated WBA super-bantamweight champion Scott Quigg (31-0-2, 23 KOs) in front of a sell-out crowd in Manchester. In a close fight, Frampton won by split decision with the judges scoring the fight 113–115, 116–112, 116–112. Frampton was in full control of the first half of the fight, during which Quigg simply could not find his range, however Quigg finally came alive down the stretch as the contest turned into a desperate tussle, but Frampton gave as good as he got.

In March 2016, several press releases announced that Frampton did not intend to face Guilerrmo Rigondeaux in his next bout. On 11 March 2016 the WBA wrote to Frampton inquiring whether the press releases were accurate and requested he confirm his intentions on or before 18 March 2016. The WBA received no response. Additionally, Rigondeaux's representatives were not approached by anyone on Frampton's behalf to negotiate a bout. "In light of Frampton's announced intention to face an opponent other than his mandatory", says WBA championships chairman Gilberto Jesus Mendoza, "and for failing to respond to WBA inquiries as to his intent, Frampton's recognition as Champion is removed."

Featherweight

Frampton vs. Santa Cruz
Frampton moved up a weight class to fight undefeated Mexican Léo Santa Cruz (32-0-1, 22 KO's) for the WBA (Super) featherweight title at the Barclays Centre in New York City on 30 July 2016. In a potential fight of the year candidate, Frampton became the first two-division world champion in the history of Northern Ireland as he dethroned Santa Cruz via a 12-round majority decision win before a crowd of 9,062. One judge scored it a 114–114 draw but the others made Frampton the winner, 116-112 and 117–111. Frampton had a higher accuracy rate, despite both fighters landing equal numbers of punches. According to CompuBox stats, Frampton landed 242 of 668 punches (36 percent), whilst Santa Cruz connected on 255 of 1,002 blows (25 percent). In the post fight, Frampton said he wanted to defend the title in his home city and did not want to rule out a rematch. In the post-fight, Frampton said, "It's a dream come true. I had the dream of winning a world title, but I never thought I'd win in two divisions. It was a tough fight. I wanted a fight the people could remember. I respect Santa Cruz a lot. He was a true warrior." Frampton vowed to break records and become the first Irishman to win world titles at three different weights. The fight averaged 480,000 and peaked at 549,000 viewers.

Frampton vs. Santa Cruz II
As discussed immediately following the first bout, a rematch between Frampton and Santa Cruz was finalised in October. There was talks the fight would take place in Frampton's home town of Belfast; however, the venue was confirmed to be at the MGM Grand in Las Vegas, the first time Frampton would fight there since becoming a professional. The date was set for 28 January 2017. 10,085 were in attendance as Frampton lost his title by majority decision. Santa Cruz and Frampton immediately discussed interest in a third fight, possibly in Belfast. Frampton earned a purse of $1 million compared to $900,000 that Santa Cruz received. Frampton only landed 133 of his 592 punches thrown (22%) whereas Santa Cruz landed 230 of his 884 thrown (26%). Nielsen Media Research reported the fight averaged 587,000 and peaked at 643,000 viewers.

Change of promoters 
On 14 May 2017, Frampton was ranked number two by the WBA at super featherweight, which indicated to many that he might be moving up to become a three-weight world champion. By the end of May, talks had begun for a fight against IBF champion Lee Selby. Frampton's promoter Barry McGuigan said the fight would happen, but not immediately due to Selby having a mandatory fight next. On 15 June, Frampton labelled Selby a 'time-waster' and announced that he would be returning to the ring in Belfast on 29 July against an unnamed opponent. Cyclone Promotions confirmed that Frampton would fight 23-year-old Mexican boxer Andrés Gutiérrez (35-1-1, 25 KOs) at the SSE Arena in Belfast in a WBC eliminator. A day before the fight, Frampton weighed 1 lb. over the 126-pound limit. Therefore, the fight was to go ahead without being an eliminator. Frampton apologised to his fans for the turn of events

Later that day, Gutiérrez slipped in his hotel shower and suffered a gash to his chin. It was also reported that he had knocked out some teeth in the process and bruised his head. The fight was, therefore, cancelled. McGuigan was said to be disappointed, but told ticket holders to retain their tickets as the card could be rescheduled. Cyclone Promotions, together with the SSE Arena and the Gutiérrez camp, said they would work quickly to reschedule the fight.

On 17 August 2017, the fight was called off completely. The news came after reports circulated that Frampton would be parting ways with long-time promoter Cyclone Promotions. A date in November was considered but was unsuitable for both boxers. Frampton officially announced the split with Cyclone Promotions on 22 August 2017. The tweet made no mention of whether he would still be trained by Shane McGuigan.

In early September, rumours circulated that Frampton would hire former boxer Jamie Moore as his trainer. On 6 September, Frampton confirmed Moore as his new trainer. On 19 September, Frampton announced he had signed a deal with MTK Global, who would work on his behalf as advisors. On 23 September it was rumoured that Frampton would sign with British promoter Frank Warren. After splitting with Cyclone, Frampton made it known that he would only sign with a promoter who could guarantee him a stadium fight in Ireland. A day later, Frampton revealed he had joined Warren: "I had interest from America and the UK but it really came down to two very similar offers from Eddie Hearn and Frank Warren. I'm desperate to kick on and have a fight before Christmas and I can confirm I will be fighting in Belfast." He wanted to secure a world title in the first half of 2018.

Frampton vs. García 
At the official press conference of the promotional announcement, it was announced that Frampton would fight an unnamed opponent on 18 November 2017 in Belfast at the SSE Arena. According to Warren, this would pave the way for a world title fight at Windsor Park in May/June 2018. On 4 October, it was confirmed that Frampton would fight Mexican boxer Horacio García (33-3-1, 24 KOs) in a ten-round bout. Speaking about the fight, Frampton said, “I asked for a ten-round fight. I would have been happy to be doing twelve rounds but speaking to my team after the bad year I’ve had and the long layoff they thought it was only fair to come back with a ten rounder before we target the big names.” This would mark Frampton's first fight in Belfast since February 2015, when he made his first defence of the IBF super-bantamweight title.

The fight was fought at 127 pounds. García's stablemate Canelo Álvarez was introduced to the crowd of 10,000 pro-Frampton fans. Frampton, in what was not his best performance in a long time, decisioned a brave and tough opponent in García after ten rounds. The three judges' scored the fight 98–93, 97-93 and 98–93. Some at ringside had the fight closer, but had Frampton winning nonetheless. Frampton started off strong, however ring-rust became an issue. From the fourth round, García repeatedly trapped Frampton against the ropes and worked him over with body shots. In round 7, Frampton was dropped after García landed a left hook. Referee Victor Loughlin, who was stood behind Frampton when the punch landed, started to count. From Loughlin's point of view, it was a punch that dropped Frampton. Replays showed that it could have been ruled a legitimate slip. Frampton admitted he let himself get into a battle. He said, "I thought it was a good fight and everyone would have enjoyed that more than me. I was boxing lovely at the start then I let him drag me into a fight. I wanted it to be a hard fight, that has got the rust off, the cobwebs have gone and I want one of the big boys. I will let the team decide who I fight next." Frampton and Warren both stated that there would be another fight in the Spring of 2018, followed by a Summer fight at Windsor Park.

Frampton vs. Donaire 
In December 2017, Frank Warren announced Frampton would next fight on 7 April 2018 in Belfast with former four-weight world champion Nonito Donaire (38-4, 24 KOs) as a potential opponent. Negotiations began on 19 December between Donaire's promoter Richard Schaefer and Frank Warren. On 21 December, the fight was officially announced by Frank Warren via the BoxNation Facebook page to take place on 21 April 2018 at the SSE Arena, Belfast. A month before the fight, it was announced that the WBO interim title would be at stake.

Frampton put on a defensive performance and beat Donaire in a unanimous decision, becoming the WBO interim featherweight champion. All three judges scored the fight 117-111 for Frampton. Frampton fought well to get a strong lead and after the sixth round started to fight on the backfoot. In the later rounds, Donaire had more success hurting Frampton on a number of occasions, landing a hard left hook in round 11.

Donaire was cut over his right eye after an accidental clash of heads in round 7, with the referee failing to call a time-out. After the fight, Frampton said on live television, "I didn't have to get involved in a fight there, as you saw in the last round Nonito Donaire is a dangerous motherfucker. I survived the round and stuck to my game plan. The only thing on my mind is Windsor Park and I can't wait to get there." According to CompuBox Stats, Frampton landed 164 of 557 punches thrown (29%) and Donaire landed 104 of his 447 thrown (23%).

Frampton vs. Jackson 
On 1 May 2018, promoter Frank Warren announced that Windsor Park in Belfast had been booked for Frampton's next fight on 18 August. Although a big name was targeted, Frampton confirmed it would be unlikely. He also stated it would not be a world title fight. After former heavyweight world champion Tyson Fury defeated Sefer Seferi in his comeback fight on 9 June, Warren announced that Fury would also appear on the undercard. On 18 June, Frampton's opponent was confirmed to be unbeaten 33-year-old Australian boxer Luke Jackson (16-0, 7 KOs), in a bout which would see Frampton defend his WBO interim belt. A professional since 2013, Jackson was undefeated in 16 fights going into the fight. Jackson came in light at 124.7 pounds. Frampton had to lose his shorts to make the featherweight limit of 126 pounds. In front of 24,000 fans, Frampton dominated Jackson in stopping him in round 9 after his corner threw in the towel. The fight was stopped at 1 minute and 21 seconds of the round. Frampton controlled the fight from the start and eventually put Jackson down with a body shot late in round 8. Jackson got up but continued to take shots. Jackson had little success. After the fight, Frampton said, “This was unreal. The atmosphere was special, the crowd was fantastic and they made my dream come true. It was unbelievable from start to finish.” With the win, Frampton retained the WBO interim title. It was also Frampton's first stoppage win in seven fights, since 2015. It was revealed a few days later that Jackson had ruptured his left ear drum in round 3 and his right ear drum in round 6. In a picture posted by Jackson, his right eye was swollen shut. Although he wanted to finish the fight, he respected his team's decision to stop the fight.

Frampton vs. Warrington

Immediately after Frampton's win over Jackson, Warren announced that Frampton would be challenging IBF featherweight champion Josh Warrington, who was also in attendance and entered the ring. Warren announced the fight would take place in December 2018 and shown live and exclusive on BT Sport Box Office, BT's new pay-per-view platform. On 28 August, Boxing Scene reported a press conference would take place in the coming weeks with the fight likely to take place at the Manchester Arena. Warren wanted the fight to take place in a stadium, however did not want any mandatories to get in the way as a stadium fight would likely take place in Spring 2019. It was reported that Frampton would earn around £2 million for the fight. On 15 September, the fight was officially announced to take place at the Manchester Arena on 22 December 2018. Warrington weighed 125.6 pounds and Frampton came in slightly heavier at 125.9 pounds, both successfully making the featherweight limit. Frampton lost the fight by unanimous decision. The judges scored the fight 116–112, 116-112 and 116–113 in favor of Warrington.

Junior-lightweight

Frampton vs. McCreary
His first fight following the loss to Warrington was scheduled for 10 August 2019, against Emmanuel Dominguez. However, Frampton was forced to withdraw from the fight after a large concrete ornament accidentally struck his left hand, fracturing his metacarpal.

After his hand healed, he moved up in weight, facing Tyler McCreary on 30 November at the Cosmopolitan of Las Vegas. Frampton came out as the aggressor from the opening bell, forcing McCreary on the defensive. In the sixth round, Frampton scored a knockdown with a left-right combination to the body of his opponent, forcing him to go down to the canvas on one knee. McCreary was back on his feet at the count of nine to continue the fight. In the ninth, Frampton landed two left hooks to the body, forcing McCreary to again take a knee. He again beat the referee's count to see out the remainder of the fight on his feet. After the ten-round contest was complete, Frampton was announced as the winner by unanimous decision, with all three judges scoring the bout 100–88. In the post-fight interview, when asked about a potential match up with WBO junior-lightweight champion Jamel Herring, who was sitting ringside, Frampton said, "I know he's a champ. I just want to fight for a world title next. I want to be involved in big fights. I would love the opportunity to fight Jamel. I'm not the champion. He's the champion."

Cancelled Herring fight, Frampton vs. Traynor 
His next fight was scheduled to take place in Belfast on 13 June 2020, against WBO champion Jamel Herring. The bout was subsequently postponed due to the COVID-19 pandemic. With no immediate date in sight, both fighters opted for a stay-busy fight.

Frampton's stay-busy fight was scheduled for 15 August 2020, against Armenian opponent Vahram Vardanyan at the York Hall. After Vardanyan was unable to secure a visa to enter the UK, former British featherweight title challenger Darren Traynor was brought in as a late replacement. Frampton dropped his much bigger opponent to the canvas with a left hook to the body in round six. In the seventh, Frampton continued his attack to the body, causing Traynor to quit on his feet after another left hook landed. With the win, Frampton moved one step closer to a proposed fight with Herring, with the last remaining obstacle being Herrings upcoming fight against Jonathan Oquendo.

Frampton vs. Herring 
After Herring defeated Oquendo in September, the WBO ordered Herring to face his mandatory challenger Shakur Stevenson before January 2021, putting the long-proposed fight with Frampton in jeopardy. The following month, the WBO gave Herring an exception to face Frampton in a voluntary defence. In January 2021, it was announced that the bout would finally take place in London on 27 February. However, after Frampton suffered a hand injury the bout was again postponed to 4 April, with the location changing to Dubai. Frampton was ranked #3 by the WBO at super featherweight. On the night, Frampton caused a cut to open above Herrings right eye in the fourth round. In the fifth, Frampton was knocked to the canvas by a straight left hand. Frampton was knocked down for a second time in the sixth round, this time from a left uppercut. Frampton made it back to his feet on unsteady legs before the referee's count of ten, only to be met with a flurry of punches from Herring, prompting Frampton's trainer to throw in the towel to hand Frampton a sixth-round technical knockout loss.

In the post-fight interview, Frampton announced his retirement, saying, "I said before the fight that I'd retire if I lost. That's exactly what I'm going to do. I've been away too long. I missed them growing up, my own kids. I want to give my life to my family. Boxing's been good to me, it's also been bad to me in recent years. I've enjoyed the best years of my career and now I just want to go home to my beautiful wife and kids."

Legacy
Hailing from Belfast, a city known for its troubled history, Frampton wanted to be remembered like Barry McGuigan, his former manager, who was seen as a symbol of peace during his fighting days: "There I was, a Catholic guy from the south boxing right in the heart of loyalist Belfast with the Troubles at their worst. We beat the East Germans, my dad got up and sang and it was a brilliant night. Boxing was the one thing then that could unify people." "I want to be a legend," Frampton said in 2015. "Honestly, that's what I want to be, a legend in Irish sport. I think it's coming up to 30 years since Barry won his world title in Loftus Road against Pedroza and people are still talking about it. I want to be like that 30 years from now – people are talking about my fights with guys like Chris Avalos and Kiko Martinez in the pubs all over Ireland. That's what I intend to do. I want to create a legacy. I want to keep beating big names. I want to get big fights, bring them back to Belfast as much as possible, and keep winning." Speaking to the BBC, McGuigan said "Carl is doing what I did. He's a beacon for peace and reconciliation and represents the future of Northern Ireland."

In 2014, he claimed Frampton "could end up as the best Irish fighter there has ever been. He can go to featherweight and super-featherweight. I don't know who the greatest Irish fighter is but if he gets the right fights he can really go as far as he wants to go." As a fighter, McGuigan was known for wearing a Dove on his shorts, as a representation of peace. He also had no national anthem played at his fights, he took up dual Irish-British citizenship which allowed him to fight for British Domestic titles, and he married a Protestant woman, all of which had huge significance at the time. It is hard to not draw comparisons, with Frampton following down an almost identical path. He too has married a Catholic woman despite being Protestant, and he too has a large following of die-hard fans from both Catholic and Protestant backgrounds who attend his fights in large numbers.

Professional boxing record

References

External links

Carl Frampton profile at Premier Boxing Champions
Carl Frampton - Profile, News Archive & Current Rankings at Box.Live

1987 births
Living people
Male boxers from Northern Ireland
Boxers from Belfast
Members of the Order of the British Empire
World boxing champions
World Boxing Association champions
International Boxing Federation champions
Commonwealth Boxing Council champions
European Boxing Union champions
World featherweight boxing champions
World super-bantamweight boxing champions